Sándor Peics (born 10 October 1899, died in 1965), also referred to as Aleksandar Peić or Alexandre Peic, is a former Hungarian footballer and football manager. As a player Peics played for both Újpest FC and Hungary before moving to Italy where he played with Hellas Verona and a spell with Yugoslav side FK Vojvodina in 1929–30.

He coached Prato SC, Cosenza, US Cerignola, FC La Chaux-de-Fonds, Hellas Verona, AC Perugia, Belenenses, Sporting Clube de Portugal, Vitória S.C., and other Portuguese clubs.

References

External links 
 Hungarian Players and Coaches in Italy, RSSSF

1899 births
1965 deaths
Hungarian footballers
Hungarian people of Croatian descent
Hungary international footballers
Újpest FC players
Nemzeti Bajnokság I players
Hellas Verona F.C. players
Expatriate footballers in Italy
FK Vojvodina players
Expatriate footballers in Yugoslavia
Hungarian football managers
Hellas Verona F.C. managers
A.C. Perugia Calcio managers
Sporting CP managers
Vitória F.C. managers
Vitória S.C. managers
Juventude Sport Clube managers
Expatriate football managers in Italy
Expatriate football managers in Portugal
Expatriate football managers in Switzerland
Association football midfielders
Sportspeople from Pécs